Cornelis "Cor" Schuuring (born 30 March 1942) is a retired Dutch road and track cyclist. His sporting career began with Olympia Amsterdam.  He won a bronze medal in the 4,000 m team pursuit along with Henk Cornelisse, Gerard Koel and Jaap Oudkerk at the 1964 Summer Olympics.

As a road racer, he won a national title in 1962 and the Olympia's Tour in 1964, as well as several local races between 1961 and 1969.

See also
 List of Dutch Olympic cyclists

References

1942 births
Living people
Dutch male cyclists
Olympic cyclists of the Netherlands
Cyclists at the 1964 Summer Olympics
Olympic bronze medalists for the Netherlands
Olympic medalists in cycling
Cyclists from Amsterdam
Medalists at the 1964 Summer Olympics